The 1977–78 Cleveland Barons season was the team's second and final season in the NHL. The relocation to Cleveland did not cure the attendance problems that plagued the franchise from its inception in Oakland as the Seals in 1967.  In June 1978, with both the Barons and the Minnesota North Stars on the verge of folding, the league approved an arrangement in which the two teams were permitted to merge under the ownership of Barons owner George Gund III.  The merged franchise continued as the Minnesota North Stars, and assumed the Barons' old place in the Adams Division.  Fifteen seasons later, the North Stars relocated to Dallas and became the Stars, bringing the NHL to Texas for the first time.  The NHL returned to the Buckeye State when the Columbus Blue Jackets began play in 2000.

Offseason

Amateur draft

Cleveland's picks at the 1977 NHL amateur draft, which was held at the NHL's office in Montreal on June 14, 1977.

Regular season
On December 11, 1977, Tom Bladon of the Philadelphia Flyers became the first defenceman in NHL history to score 8 points in one game. He scored four goals and four assists versus the Cleveland Barons. It was 25% of his point total for the entire season.

Final standings

Schedule and results

Regular season

Detailed records

Player stats

Skaters
Note: GP=  Games played; G = Goals; A = Assists; Pts = Points; PIM = Penalties in minutes; +/- = Plus/minus

†Denotes player spent time with another team before joining Barons. Stats reflect time with the Barons only. ‡Traded mid-season.

Goaltenders
Note: GP = Games played; TOI = Time on ice (minutes); W = Wins; L = Losses; T = Ties; GA = Goals against; SO = Shutouts; GAA = Goals against average

Transactions
The Barons were involved in the following transactions during the 1977–78 season:

Trades

Additions and subtractions

Playoffs
The Barons did not qualify for the playoffs.

References
 Barons on Hockey Database
 Barons on Database Hockey

Cleve
Cleve
Cleveland Barons (NHL)
Cleveland
Cleveland